The J. M. Davis House is a historic house at 202 6th Street in Juneau, Alaska.  This two-story wood-frame house was built in 1892, when Juneau was little more than a gold mining camp, and remains one of its most elegant homes of the period, as well as one of its oldest buildings.  The builder, J. M. Davis, was a miner whose wife was a wealthy English artist.  Their son, Trevor Davis, was a noted Alaskan landscape photographer; the house has also served as the official residence of the local US Coast Guard Admiral.

The house was listed on the National Register of Historic Places in 1982.

See also
National Register of Historic Places listings in Juneau, Alaska

References

1892 establishments in Alaska
Houses completed in 1892
Houses in Juneau, Alaska
Houses on the National Register of Historic Places in Alaska
Buildings and structures on the National Register of Historic Places in Juneau, Alaska